André Vieira Viana (born 27 December 1992) is a Portuguese footballer who plays as a midfielder.

Club career
He made his professional debut in the Segunda Liga for Trofense on 2 October 2011 in a game against Belenenses.

References

External links

1992 births
Sportspeople from Trofa
Living people
Portuguese footballers
Association football midfielders
C.D. Trofense players
Campeonato de Portugal (league) players
Liga Portugal 2 players